Liang Zheyu (born 11 February 1998) is a Chinese footballer.

Club career
Liang Zheyu was scouted by Chinese Super League side Guangzhou R&F in 2017 after his promising performance in the University football league with South China University of Technology. He signed his first professional contract with Guangzhou R&F's satellite team R&F (Hong Kong) in the Hong Kong Premier League in February 2018. On 26 February 2018, he made his senior debut in a 3–1 away loss to Kitchee, coming on as a substitute for Yang Ziyi in the 78th minute.

Career statistics 
 

1League Cups include Hong Kong Senior Challenge Shield and Hong Kong Sapling Cup.

References

1998 births
Living people
Association football forwards
Chinese footballers
Footballers from Guangzhou
R&F (Hong Kong) players
Hong Kong Premier League players
South China University of Technology alumni
Liga de Elite players
21st-century Chinese people